The Shrink Next Door is an American psychological black comedy-drama miniseries developed by Georgia Pritchett based on the podcast of the same title by Joe Nocera. The miniseries premiered on Apple TV+ on November 12, 2021. The podcast and TV series are both based on the real life story of psychiatrist Isaac Herschkopf, who in 2021 was determined by New York's Department of Health to have violated "minimal acceptable standards of care in the psychotherapeutic relationship".

Premise 
Psychiatrist Dr. Ike Herschkopf inserts himself into the life of one of his patients, Marty Markowitz.

Cast

Main 
 Will Ferrell as Martin "Marty" Markowitz
 Paul Rudd as Dr. Isaac "Ike" Herschkopf
 Kathryn Hahn as Phyllis Shapiro
 Casey Wilson as Bonnie Herschkopf
 Cornell Womack as Bruce

Recurring 
 Sarayu Blue as Miriam
 Robin Bartlett as Cathy
 Allan Wasserman as Rabbi Sherman
 Christina Vidal as Hannah

Episodes

Production 
It was announced in February 2020 that a television adaptation of the podcast The Shrink Next Door was in development, in which Will Ferrell and Paul Rudd would star. The series was greenlit and ordered by Apple TV+ in April. Kathryn Hahn and Casey Wilson were added as leads in November, with Sarayu Blue cast in a recurring role in February 2021.

Filming began in November 2020, in Los Angeles and finished in March 2021.

Reception 
 Metacritic, which uses a weighted average, assigned a score of 61 out of 100 based on 29 critics, indicating "generally favorable reviews".

See also 
 What About Bob?
 List of podcast adaptations

References

External links 
 

2020s American black comedy television series
2020s American television miniseries
2021 American television series debuts
2021 American television series endings
Apple TV+ original programming
English-language television shows
Television series by Gloria Sanchez Productions
Television shows based on podcasts